Alexandre Baril (born 1979 in Granby, Quebec), is a Canadian writer and since 2018 an associate professor at the School of Social Work, at the University of Ottawa. He researches sexual and gender diversity, bodily diversity ((dis)ability and health), and linguistic diversity. He considers his work to be intersectional, involving queer, trans, feminist and gender studies, as well as sociology of the body, health, social movements, and of critical suicidology.

Biography 
Baril attended the Université de Sherbrooke, earning a BA in philosophy with a minor in theology (2000–2003) as well as a MA in philosophy (2003–2005) from the Department of Philosophy and Applied Ethics. He received the highest distinction for his thesis, titled: Judith Butler and Postmodern Feminism: A Theoretical and Conceptual Analysis of a Controversial School of Thought, and has since published many articles on Judith Butler’s political philosophy based on this work. After completing his master's degree, Baril pursued a doctoral degree in philosophy (2006–2010) from the Université du Québec à Montréal (UQAM) where he completed all program requirements other than the dissertation. He then went to the University of Ottawa to begin a second doctorate in women's studies (2010–2013) at the Institute of Feminist and Gender Studies. His dissertation, titled: Bodily Normativity Under the Knife: (Re)thinking Intersectionality and Solidarities Between Feminist, Trans, and Disability Studies Through Transsexuality and Transability earned him the highest distinction and the Pierre Laberge prize, awarded to the best dissertation in the humanities.

From 2014 to 2015, he secured a postdoctoral fellowship from the Social Sciences and Humanities Research Council of Canada (SSHRC). He pursued his postdoctoral research in the United-States, at the City University of New York and at Wesleyan University. This research, conducted with sociologist Victoria Pitts-Taylor, addressed the sociology of the body and of social movements. During this period, Baril also held the position of invited assistant professor at Wesleyan University, teaching courses on issues related to bodily modifications and social movements.

He returned to the University of Ottawa for an appointment as a replacement assistant professor at the Institute of Feminist and Gender Studies In 2015–2016. He taught several courses, including courses on queer and feminist theory in both French and English.

In 2016–2017, he was awarded the Izaak Walton Killam scholarship to pursue his postdoctoral research in political science at Dalhousie University.

Baril accepted the position of assistant professor at the University of Ottawa's School of Social Work In 2018. He was hired to conduct research on intersectionality and diversity, including sexual, gender (trans), bodily (disability), and linguistic diversity. This appointment was a historic moment for trans people and trans studies in Canada. Baril was the first Francophone trans person in Canadian history to be employed as a professor specializing in trans studies to teach on sexual and gender diversity in French.

Career 

Baril is an activist and public speaker for the rights of trans people, people living with disabilities, and those with suicidal thoughts. In media interviews, Baril has described the violence and discrimination experienced by trans and marginalized people. He denounces the social inequalities endured by these communities and shares solutions to put an end to them.

The French-language neologisms he has coined and used (cisnormativité, cisgenrenormativité, transcapacité, suicidisme, etc.) represent contributions to many fields of study, including trans, gender, and (dis)ability studies, as well as critical suicidology.

Awards 
In December 2017, Baril was awarded the title of Personality of the Week by Radio-Canada (Canadian Broadcasting Corporation) for his involvement in the media after being hired by the University of Ottawa. As is mentioned in several interviews and articles, Baril is the first trans person to be hired by a Canadian university to teach gender and sexual diversity in French.

In 2011, Baril received the Lana St-Cyr Award from the Aide aux transsexuels et transsexuelles du Québec (ATQ) in recognition of the major role he played in organizing the first trans protest in Quebec history on June 17, 2010, in Montreal. At the time, Baril was involved in PolitiQ-queer solidaire, an activist group fighting against all forms of heterosexist and cissexist oppression and exclusion in Quebec. Nearly 200 people gathered for the 2010 demonstration, which included community organizations advocating for the rights of trans people and leading public figures from legal, academic, and political sectors. The protesters demanded changes be made to Quebec's existing regulations requiring those seeking gender marker changes to their civil status to undergo forced sterilization, as well as more accessible ways of changing one's name.

Research 
Baril is described as one of the first trans researchers in Canada to publish work on trans issues from a transactivist perspective in the French language. His first article on trans issues, published in 2009, is titled: Transsexualité et privilèges masculins : fiction ou réalité? (Transsexuality and Male Privilege: Fact or Fiction?). From a transactivist perspective, Baril has coined several more appropriate and more respectful new terms to address the forms of oppression experienced by the marginalized groups he takes an interest in. His doctoral thesis includes an analytical glossary in which this trans and disability studies-related vocabulary is presented. This new terminology allows for an exploration of the oppressive dynamics reproduced by/in social movements and encourages critical reflection about the flaws and limitations of intersectional analyses as they exist today.

While Canadian researchers had already been publishing on trans issues before Baril, this work was done by Anglophones. Examples of these trans researchers, working in Canadian English-language universities, include: Jin Haritaworn, Aaron Devor, Dan Irving, Trish Salah, Bobby Noble and Viviane Namaste. In the context of French-language universities, there is Line Chamberland, the research chair on homophobia, and Annie Pullen Sansfaçon, co-founder of Gender Creative Kids Canada (Enfants transgenres Canada) and professor at the Université de Montréal, who work on trans issues. These scholars are not self-identified as trans people.

Cisnormativité / cisgenrenormativité (cisnormativity / cisgendernormativity) 

Inspired by the concept of heteronormativity, cis (gender) normativity can be defined as "the normative dimension of the dominant cisgenderist system, which understands people who identify with the gender and sex assigned to them at birth as more normal than those people who decide to live as another gender and/or transition." This dominant normative system promotes negative judgments, discrimination, and violence towards trans people while erasing their experiences and realities. The concept of cisgendernormativity is a neologism referring to the specific normativity of cisgender and cissexual identities. It is, therefore, a reference to a cis normativity tied to one's gender.

Baril is the first person to create and define the notions of cisnormativity and cisgendernormativity in French in his 2009 article, on male privilege. He expands on these notions in his 2013 thesis. His article and that of Bauer et al.—"I Don't Think This Is Theoretical; This Is Our Lives: How Erasure Impacts Health Care for Transgender People" (2009)—the first to define the concept of cisnormativity in English, were published simultaneously.

Transféminisme (transfeminism) 
Transfeminism is a "theoretical and political collaboration between feminist and trans studies" that aims to fight against sexism and transphobia. This feminist stream takes the multiple, diverse experiences of women into consideration, including those of transgender men and women.

The term was first used and defined in French-language academic work by Baril, who employed the approach to analyze male privilege in trans men. His work was inspired by activist and scholar, Emi Koyama.

Transcapacitaire (Transabled) 
The term "transabled" refers to a non-disabled person's need to transform their body to acquire a disability. Moreover, these people maintain that this experience should not simply be understood as a decision or 'choice,' but rather as a need" to modify various physical abilities that are not necessarily limited to amputations. This term deviates from medical and sexology models that favours the language of apotemnophilia and Body integrity dysphoria (BIID).

Baril did not coin the term transabled in English; transabled activists did. But he translated and coined the term in French. Transabled is derived from the word "able" which "refers to various abilities: physical, mental, psychological, etc. that are not assigned the positive or negative values associated with other terms such as capable/incapable, validity, etc., and denotes the presence or absence of ability."

Baril coined these terms in his thesis once he became aware of the absence of work on the realities of people with disabilities in intersectional feminist analyses. His goal was to understand the development of "expository discourses (etiology and suggested treatment methods) surrounding traceability, and the effects of such discourses on the reception (positive or negative) of transabled testimonials." Faced with the absence of respectful vocabulary in the French language, Baril chose to create new terminology to avoid using the existing terms, whose negative connotations can undermine the realities of these individuals.

Transitude (transness) 
Transitude refers to the condition of—or the state of being—trans. This neologism was inspired by the English term, "transness."

Baril coined this term in 2014 for a scientific presentation in 2015. The term has been circulating online since 2014 and was taken up by cartoonist Sophie Labelle in 2015, for her webcomic Assignée garçon (titled Assigned Male in English).

Suicidisme (suicidism) 
Suicidism denotes "a system of oppression (founded on non-suicidal perspectives) encompassing normative, discursive, medical, legal, social, political, economic, and epistemic structures in which suicidal individuals experience multiple forms of injustice and violence."

In the field of suicide studies (or suicidology), Baril is described as the first to theorize the oppression of suicidal people from an intersectional, anti-ableist, and anti-sanist perspective. To do so, he borrows from Robert McRuer’s crip theories (2006) as well as from the field of critical disability studies on disability to "interpret suicidal thoughts and gestures" and creates what he calls the "socio-subjective model of disability." He maintains that suicidal individuals should be able to speak freely about their thoughts, not just for the sake of enriching approaches to suicide prevention, but also to assist, using a harm reduction approach, those suicidal individuals who are determined to die by suicide when their need to die is profound and stable. This is a view that is rejected by the suicide prevention community and by the disability rights community generally, which tends to oppose physician assisted suicide.

According to Baril, suicidal individuals are left out of the intersectional analyses of social movements and those anti-oppression movements reproduce the oppression they experience through paternalistic, ableist, and sanist discourses.

Rethinking consent through intimate images of trans people in the media  
Baril is interested in how the media overexploits trans issues without considering the potential consequences for—or the well-being of—the communities involved. He studies the objectification and sexualization of trans bodies in the media. In his work, he advocates for the development of an ethical approach to critically reflect on the possible consequences that media representations focused on the intimate lives of trans people can have. In one of his articles, he suggests we "initiate a conversation with media professionals and encourage the development of complex ethical approaches regarding the consent of marginalized groups, including trans* people, to the public distribution of intimate images."

Publications 
 Alexandre Baril and Marjorie Silverman, Forgotten lives: Trans older adults living with dementia at the intersection of cisgenderism, ableism/cogniticism and ageism, Sexualities, 2019.
 Alexandre Baril, Gender IdentIty Trouble: An Analysis of the Underrepresentation of Trans* Professors in Canadian Universities, Chiasma, no. 5, 2019, p. 90-128.
 Alexandre Baril, Confessing Society, Confessing Cis-tem: Rethinking Consent Through Intimate Images of Trans* People in the Media, Frontiers: A Journal of Women Studies, 39, 2, 2018, p. 1-25.
 Alexandre Baril, The Somatechnologies of Canada’s Medical Assistance in Dying Law: LGBTQ Discourses on Suicide and the Injunction to Live, Somatechnics, 7, 2, 2017, p. 201-217.
 Alexandre Baril, Intersectionality, Lost in Translation? (Re)thinking Inter-sections Between Anglophone and Francophone Intersectionality, Atlantis: Critical Studies in Gender, Culture & Social Justice, 38, 1, 2017, p. 125-137.
 Alexandre Baril, “Doctor, Am I an Anglophone Trapped in a Francophone Body?” An Intersectional Analysis of Trans-crip-t Time in Ableist, Cisnormative, Anglonormative Societies, Journal of Literary & Cultural Disability Studies, 10, 2, 2016, p. 155-172.
 Alexandre Baril, Francophone Trans/Feminisms: Absence, Silence, Emergence, TSQ: Transgender Studies Quarterly, 3, 1/2, 2016, p. 40-47.
 Alexandre Baril, “How Dare You Pretend to Be Disabled?” The Discounting of Transabled People and their Claims in Disability Movements and Studies, Disability & Society, 30, 5, 2015, p. 689-703.
 Alexandre Baril, Needing to Acquire a Physical Impairment/Disability: Re)thinking the Connections Between Trans and Disability Studies Through Transability, Hypatia: Journal of Feminist Philosophy, 30, 1, 2015, p. 30-48.
 Alexandre Baril, Transness as Debility: Rethinking Intersections Between Trans and Disabled Embodiments, Feminist Review, 111, 2015, p. 59-74.
 Alexandre Baril and K. Trevenen, Exploring Ableism and Cisnormativity in the Conceptualization of Identity and Sexuality “Disorders”, Annual Review of Critical Psychology, 11, 2014, p. 389-416.

References 

1979 births
Academic staff of the University of Ottawa
Canadian social work academics
LGBT studies academics
Disability studies academics
People from Granby, Quebec
Writers from Quebec
Université de Sherbrooke alumni
Francophone Quebec people
Living people
Canadian transgender writers
21st-century Canadian male writers
Transgender academics
Transgender studies academics
LGBT philosophers
21st-century Canadian LGBT people
Canadian LGBT academics